Palmariaceae is a family of algae.  It includes the edible seaweed dulse (Palmaria palmata).

References

Florideophyceae
Red algae families